Henry Miller (1891–1980) was an American writer.

Henry Miller may also refer to:

Politics
Henry W. Miller (1807–1885), member of the Iowa legislature
Henry Miller (Australian politician) (1809–1888), Australian politician and banker
Henry Miller (New Zealand politician) (1830–1918), New Zealand politician
Henry Miller (Wisconsin judge) (1849–1920), American politician, businessman, and jurist
 Henry Horton Miller (1861–1916), Canadian politician
Henry D. Miller (1867–1945), Iowa politician
Henry Pomeroy Miller (1884–1946), Texas politician

Sports
Henry Miller (cricketer) (1859–1927), English cricketer
Heinie Miller (1893–1964), American football player and coach
Hank Miller (1917–1972), American Negro league baseball player
Henry Armstrong Miller (born 1969), aka Sentoryū Henri, mixed martial arts fighter and former sumo wrestler

Others
Henry Miller (British Army officer) (1785–1866), first commandant of the Moreton Bay penal colony and founder of Brisbane
Henry Miller (rancher) (1827–1916), German-American landowner and cattle rancher, known as the Cattle King
Henry C. Miller (1828–1899), Justice of the Louisiana Supreme Court 
Henry Miller (actor) (1858–1926), English-born American actor
Henry Miller (IBEW) (1858–1896), first Grand President of the International Brotherhood of Electrical Workers
Henry J. F. Miller (1890–1949), demoted United States Army Air Corps major general
Henry Miller (clinician) (1913–1976), former Vice-Chancellor at Newcastle University
Henry F. Miller (born 1916), American architect, designer of Henry F. Miller House
Henry Miller (lawyer) (1931–2020), American lawyer and jurist
Henry I. Miller (born 1947), American medical researcher and columnist

See also
Henry F. Miller House, Orange, Connecticut
Henry Millar (died 1959), Irish rugby player
Harry Miller (disambiguation)
Heinrich Müller (disambiguation)